Robert William “R.W.” Schambach (April 3, 1926 – January 17, 2012) was an American televangelist, pastor, Word of Faith minister of the Word and author. His television program, Power Today, can be seen on the DayStar Christian TV network as well as over the internet in streaming podcasts.

Early life and faith
Robert W. Schambach was born on April 3, 1926, in Harrisburg, Pennsylvania, to Harry Ellsworth and Ann Moyer Schambach. He became a born-again Christian as a youth on a street corner when the evangelist C. M. Ward had given an altar call to receive Jesus Christ.

Ministry
 Ordained as a pastor by C. M. Ward, Schambach, who was also a protégé of the evangelist/faith healer T. L. Osborn, received his formal training at Central Bible Institute in Springfield, Missouri, in the mid-1940s, after serving in World War II as a navy boilermaker on a destroyer in the South Pacific and Asia. He then began an apprenticeship with A. A. Allen and worked for five years. Schambach began travelling extensively with Allen on his "Miracle Crusades" during that period along with Don Stewart and Leroy Jenkins.

Personal life
Schambach's wife was Mary Winifred Donald (born September 3, 1926, in Philadelphia, Pennsylvania). R.W. met Mary while she was a student at the Eastern Bible Institute of the Assemblies of God in Green Lane, Pennsylvania (now the University of Valley Forge in Phoenixville, Pennsylvania). They married the following year, on September 4, 1948 (just one day after Mary's birthday). The couple subsequently had two sons and a daughter: Bobby, Bruce and Donna. Donna Schambach is a pastor and Word of Faith minister in the Tyler area. Schambach had six grandchildren: Rachel, Bobby III, Mark, Amanda and Christi. They had been married for 61 years when Mary died from natural causes in Tyler, Texas on April 20, 2010, at age 83. Less than two years later he died of a heart attack on January 17, 2012, age 85. He was interred next to his wife at the Cathedral in the Pines Cemetery in Tyler, Texas.

See also
Faith healing
Glossolalia
Pentecostalism
Word of Faith
Holy Spirit

References

External links
R. W. Schambach bio at official website

American evangelists
American television evangelists
People from Harrisburg, Pennsylvania
Clergy from Philadelphia
1926 births
2012 deaths
Pennsylvania Republicans
Texas Republicans
People from Tyler, Texas
United States Navy personnel of World War II
United States Navy sailors
Television personalities from Texas